Rakovanite, Na3{H3[V10O28]}•15H20, is a member of the pascoite family. It is a transparent, brittle mineral occurring in the monoclinic crystal system. It is orange in color and has an orange-yellow colored streak. Rakovanite is soft with a Mohs hardness of 1 and a calculated density of 2.407g cm−3. It does not fluoresce in long- or short-wave ultraviolet radiation. Rakovanite crystals are up to one mm in maximum dimension and vary in habit from blocky to prismatic on [001], commonly exhibiting steps and striations parallel to [001].  Its name honors John Rakovan, professor, Department of Geology and Environmental Earth Science, Miami University.

Occurrence 
Rakovanite was found on specimens from the Sunday mine and the West Sunday mine, Slick Rock district, San Miguel County, Colorado, US.

It occurs as crystalline crusts on sandstone fractures in the mine walls of the Sunday and West Sunday mines. The best crystals were found perched on an amorphous dehydrated vanadium phase along with crystals tightly adhered to a corvusite-montroseite matrix.

It forms from the oxidation of montroseite-corvusite assemblages. It is associated calcite, corvusite, hewettite, hughesite, montroseite, munirite, paramontroseite, pascoite, rossite, sherwoodite, and other unidentified vanadium phases as well as at least two other potentially new decavanadate species. It forms aqueous solutions of relatively low pH when water reacts with pyrite in the deposit under ambient temperatures and generally oxidizing near-surface environments.

Atomic arrangement
Rakovanite crystal unit consists of the decavanadate polyanion similar to that found in other decavanadate-bearing mineral. The decavanadate polyanion is formed of ten distorted, edge-sharing octahedra which differs in rakovanite unlike other minerals. It contains three hydrogen atoms, forming a {H3[V10O28]}3- anionic complex. Its individual polyanions are linked to an interstitial complex.

Chemical composition

Empirical formula (based on V = 10 apfu): (Na2.90K0.07Ca0.01Al0.01)ε2.99{H2.98[V10O28]}•15H2O; the ideal formula is Na3{H3[V10O28]}•15H2O calculated as ideal value for Na3{H3[V10O28]}•15H2O. Composition normalized to 100% using ideal H2O value from crystal structure results.

See also

 Classification of minerals
 List of minerals

References

Oxide minerals
Monoclinic minerals
Minerals in space group 14